Zahra Arafat (born November 8, 1969), is a Bahraini actress residing in Kuwait. She settled in Kuwait in 1997, and she would begin her performing career that year co-starring with Tariq Al-Ali in I Won’t Live Under My Wife’s Mantel. Her career continued since then with appearances in many works for television and theatre throughout the Persian Gulf region.

Career

Film

Variety television co-hosting

Television series

=Theatre

References

External links
 El Cinema page

1969 births
Bahraini television actresses
Bahraini stage actresses
Bahraini film actresses
Living people